Cariniana rubra (commonly known as the jequitibá-vermelho or cachimbo-de-macaco in Brazilian Portuguese) is a species of woody plant in the family Lecythidaceae endemic to north-central Brazil.

References

rubra
Flora of Brazil